George Clifford Sziklai (July 9, 1909 – September 9, 1998) was a Hungarian-American renowned electronics engineer, who among many other contributions to radio and TV electronics invented the transistor configuration named after him, the Sziklai pair.

Educated at the University of Budapest and the Technical University Munich, Sziklai emigrated to New York in 1930. His long career included stations at Radio Corporation of America and Westinghouse Electric Corporation before he joined Lockheed's Palo Alto Research Laboratory in 1967.

Sziklai, who held some 160 patents including color television transmission, is also credited with constructing the first Image Orthicon television camera and inventing a high-speed elevator.

References

Hungarian electrical engineers
20th-century Hungarian inventors
1909 births
1998 deaths
Engineers from California
People from Los Altos, California
Technical University of Munich alumni
20th-century American engineers
Hungarian emigrants to the United States